William Goate (or Goat) VC (12 January 1836 – 24 October 1901) was an English recipient of the Victoria Cross.

Details
Goate was 22 years old, and a Lance Corporal in the 9th Lancers, British Army during the Indian Mutiny when the following deed took place on 6 March 1858 at the Capture of Lucknow, India for which he was awarded the VC:

He later achieved the rank of Corporal.

Later life
Goate moved to Southsea in May 1900 having lived in Jarrow and worked for 22 years in Palmers shipbuilding firm and that for 18 years he was a member of the Jarrow Company of the Volunteers in which he held the same rank as he did in the Lancers. He died aged 64 at 22 Leopold Street, Southsea, from cancer.

Goat was buried in Highland Road Cemetery and the grave has been reused twice since. There was no headstone marking his grave, but a memorial stone was erected in October 2003.

Medal
His Victoria Cross is displayed in the Regimental Museum of the 9th/12th Royal Lancers at Derby Museum, England.

References

External links
Location of grave and VC medal (Hampshire)
 
The VC Its Heroes and their Valor
Auction details

British recipients of the Victoria Cross
Indian Rebellion of 1857 recipients of the Victoria Cross
9th Queen's Royal Lancers soldiers
1836 births
1901 deaths
Deaths from cancer in England
Deaths from stomach cancer
People from Morningthorpe
British Army recipients of the Victoria Cross
People from Jarrow
Military personnel from Norfolk
Burials in Hampshire